The Kunsthalle Bremen is an art museum in Bremen, Germany. It is located close to the Bremen Old Town on the "Culture Mile". The Kunsthalle was built in 1849, enlarged in 1902 by architect Eduard Gildemeister, and expanded several more times, most notably in 2011. Since 1977, the building has been designated a Kulturdenkmal on Germany's buildings heritage list.

The museum houses a collection of European paintings from the 14th century to the present day, sculptures from the 16th to 21st centuries and a New Media collection. Among its highlights are French and German paintings from the 19th and 20th century, including important works by Claude Monet, Édouard Manet and Paul Cézanne, along with major paintings by Lovis Corinth, Max Liebermann, Max Beckmann and Paula Modersohn-Becker. The New Media section features works by John Cage, Otto Piene, Peter Campus, Olafur Eliasson, and Nam June Paik. The Department of Prints and Drawings has 220,000 sheets from the 15th to 20th centuries, one of largest collections of its kind in Europe.

The Kunsthalle Bremen is operated by the non-profit Bremen Art Society, making it the only German museum with an extensive art collection from the 14th to 21st centuries which is still in private ownership.

History

History of the Art Society 
In 1823, a group of 34 businessmen interested in art founded an Art Society in Bremen with the aim of "spreading a sense of beauty and form." It is one of the oldest such societies in Germany. The first years of the association's activities were focused on private art exhibitions, with the acquisition of works backed financially from ticket proceeds and business donations. Ten years after its founding, the Society owned 13 paintings, 585 drawings and 3917 leaf prints. The majority of the paintings were Old Masters, including the famous Madonna of Masolino and a series of paintings of Dutch painters of the 17th Century, such as Jan van Goyen and Pieter Wouwerman.  After 1843, large public exhibitions were organized in association with similar associations in Hannover, Lübeck, Greifswald, Rostock and Stuttgart. By 1846 the society had grown to 575 members. The Kunstverein Bremen is still the exclusive owner of the Kunsthalle Bremen and today has over 8000 members. The society is funded from foundations, private donations, bequests, and grants from the city of Bremen.

History of the Kunsthalle

The building of 1849 

Supported by numerous foundations and patrons, the Art Society put out a competitive bid for a new museum building. A then very young Lueder Rutenberg—himself a member of the Art Association—won against prominent competitors. The Society broke ground on the Kunsthalle on 1 July 1847, becoming the first Society in Germany with its own building. The construction project was located on a former rubbish dump in the vicinity of the old city ramparts and the building was finished in 1849. Rutenberg's design was of a dignified but understated two-story building with a three-axis central projection of round arches. While the collections were largely owned by the Kunstverein, the property itself was owned by the city. Four stone figures over the entrance are of Raphael, Michelangelo, Dürer, and Rubens, created by the sculptor Adolph Steinhäuser (1825-1858).

Expansion in 1902 

After another competition among Bremen architects, a much-needed enlargement was commissioned in 1898. Albert Dunkel was selected to design the interiors, Eduard Gildemeister for the monumental sandstone facade, and decoration by renowned sculptors Georg Roemer and Georg Wrba. The foundation work was begun in 1899 and on 15 February 1902 the opening ceremony took place. The facade was under construction until 1904. The expansion was funded by foundations and businessmen in Bremen.

Consequences of World War II 

The art gallery was closed shortly after the outbreak of war and the collection was initially stored in the basement. In the night of 5 September 1942, a fire bomb destroyed the central staircase and six rooms upstairs. It also burned the painting Washington Crossing the Delaware by Emanuel Leutze, which because of its size could not be removed. Today a second version hangs in the Metropolitan Museum of Art in New York.

After this damage, large parts of the collection were moved to protected areas underneath the Bremer Landesbank and Norddeutschen Kreditbank. As the severity of air raids on Bremen increased, Mayor Böhmcker finally decreed that the collection should be housed outside the city in safety. The removal of the artworks began in 1943 to four different places: the paintings, drawings and graphic sheets were divided between Karnzow Castle of Count Königsmarck near Kyritz, Neumühle Castle of Count von der Schulenburg in Salzwedel, and Schwöbber Castle near Hameln. The sculptures were taken to the princely crypt at Bückeburg Castle.

Karnzow Castle was located in Margraviate of Brandenburg closer to Berlin and it held 50 paintings, 1715 drawings and about 3000 prints from the collection. The castle was taken in May 1945 by Soviet troops and on their return home it was plundered. The Soviets also left the hiding place open, with the result that works of art were within the reach of everyone. Berlin sculptor Kurt Reutti, head of a unit of the Berlin City Council, was able to find several items by extensive research and reclamation from the local black market. However, the losses of the Kunsthalle Bremen stand alongside those of the Prussian Cultural Heritage Foundation and the Dresden art collections as the largest and most devastating of any German museum from the war. In all over 1,500 works from the Kunsthalle remain missing today.

Reconstruction after 1945 
In the immediate postwar period, the conditions of the Museum and the activities of the Art Society were extremely difficult. Between 1947 and 1948, soldiers of the US Army were billeted in the art gallery, Print Room and Board Room. Because of war damage the building was unusable for displaying art, although exhibitions were organized at other locations starting in 1946. In 1948, ten rooms upstairs were again opened to the public for the 125th anniversary of the Art Society. After further repairs, all rooms on the upper floor were usable again by the end of 1951. In 1961 an extensive restoration was carried out which repaired the heavy war damage. The staircase and the front entrance were modernized in the style of the time.

Expansion in 1982 
An extension to the building was completed in 1982 by architect Werner Düttmann and caused a scandal. Contrary to the plans which had been approved in sandstone red brick facade was built instead.

Renovations 1990–1999 
In 1990 the Art Society secured financing for the renovation of the workshops, storage areas and the main Print Room of the now structurally and functionally obsolete building. Between 1996 and 1998, more renovations of the Art Gallery continued under the chairman Georg Abegg and director Wulf Herzogenrath. These were urgent because the exhibition halls were in poor condition, the lighting did not meet the requirements and climate conditions did not meet international standards.

In 1995 the Art Society's board of trustees began a "Save the Art Gallery" capital campaign under the leadership of the merchant and deputy chairman Dieter Harald Berghöfer, which reached out to patrons. Within one year it had received 7 million marks, a third of the calculated construction costs (in a city with fewer than 600,000 inhabitants). The state of Bremen and the Federal Republic then provided the other two thirds. Due to unexpected difficulties with the building, construction costs rose to almost 25 million DM, and these additional costs were raised solely by donors who wanted to support the efforts of the Art Society and the board of trustees.

As a result of the renovation, golden oak parquet replaced the linoleum, while the 24 halls and intimate cabinets in which the permanent collection is grouped are bathed in color.

Extension 2011
The project cost around €30 million. The families of Friedrich and Peter Lürßen of Lürssen shipyard fame and the Karin and Uwe Hollweg Foundation contributed a third, and the city of Bremen and the Federal Government each one-third of these costs. Additional costs of €3.5 million for among other things geothermal heating were covered by the art society. The new Art Gallery opened on 20 August 2011 and held its first major exhibition at the on 15 October 2011. [3]

Collections

Paintings 
The museum's paintings span the 14th century to the present day and are primarily West European. Among the collection's highlights are French and German works from the 19th and 20th century, including important pieces by Paul Cézanne, Édouard Manet, Claude Monet, Henri de Toulouse-Lautrec and Vincent van Gogh. It holds major paintings by Max Beckmann, Lovis Corinth, Max Liebermann, and Paula Modersohn-Becker. The museum also houses early modernist works by artists from the nearby art colony of Worpswede. Other represented artists include:

 Andreas Achenbach
 Albrecht Altdorfer
 Arnold Boecklin
 Carl Blechen
 Merry-Joseph Blondel
 Willy von Beckerath
 Julius Schnorr von Carolsfeld
 Gustave Courbet
 Camille Corot
 Lucas Cranach the Elder
 Eugène Delacroix
 Albrecht Dürer
 Adam Elsheimer
 Heinrich Jakob Fried
 Joseph von Führich
 Otto Gildemeister
 Eva Gonzalès
 Franz Krüger
 Johann Liss
 August Macke
 Franz Marc
 Hans von Marées
 Anton Raphael Mengs
 Edvard Munch
 Friedrich Paul Nerly
 Jules Pascin
 Camille Pissarro
 Odilon Redon
 Théo van Rysselberghe
 Otto Scholderer
 Carl Schuch
 Alfred Sisley
 Max Slevogt
 Sébastien Stoskopff
 Hans Thoma
 Carl Wagner

Prints and drawings 

The Department of Prints and Drawings has 220,000 sheets from the 15th to 20th century, including hand drawings, aquarelles, copperplate prints, and printed graphs. It is one of largest and most important collections of its kind in Europe. Artists include:

 Edgar Degas
 Albrecht Dürer
 Berthe Morisot

New Media 
The New Media section features works by John Cage, Otto Piene, Peter Campus, Olafur Eliasson, Nam June Paik and others. The Kunstverein promotes current art trends by awarding the Böttcherstrasse Art Prize and organizing exhibitions of the Förderkreis für Gegenwartskunst (association for the support of contemporary art).

Baldin Collection 

In 1945 Soviet Army officer Viktor Baldin discovered the stored works from the Kunsthalle in the basement of Karnzow Castle. In order to protect them from complete destruction, he grabbed drawings by Rembrandt, Titian, Rubens, Goya, Van Gogh and Édouard Manet and brought them to the Soviet Union in a suitcase. In 1963 Baldin became Director of the Moscow Architecture Museum. In the autumn of 1989 he visited the Bremen Kunsthalle and reported to the chairman of the Art Society that he had the time to get two paintings and 362 drawings out of Castle Karnzow and had handed them over to the Schtschusev State Research and Science Museum for safekeeping. In the following years he tried repeatedly to return the artwork to the Bremen Art Society by appealing to the highest authorities of the USSR, but without success. The whole issue of "looted art" from Germany was still taboo at that time. In 1995, a show named after him was held in the Hermitage collection in St. Petersburg. In February 2003, the then Russian Minister of Culture, after a formal request of the Kunstverein in 2000, provided a written commitment that the Baldin Collection should be returned to Bremen. Although the collection is not covered by the Plundered Art Laws, the Russian State Duma has so far refused to return it. In 2005 Russia's Culture Minister Alexander Sokolov said that returning the collection to Germany was "out of the question."

See also
 List of art museums
 List of museums in Germany

References

External links
  
 Repatriation of artworks stolen from the museum during WWII
Virtual tour of the Kunsthalle Bremen provided by Google Arts & Culture

Museums in Bremen (city)
Art museums and galleries in Germany
Art and cultural repatriation
Art museums established in 1849
1849 establishments in Germany